Sydney Victor Ward (20 March 1903 – 27 May 1988) was an Australian politician.

He was born in Woodbridge. In 1956 he was elected to the Tasmanian House of Assembly as a Labor member for Braddon. He was a minister from 1961 to 1969, and served in the House until his retirement in 1976.

References

1903 births
1988 deaths
Members of the Tasmanian House of Assembly
Australian Labor Party members of the Parliament of Tasmania
20th-century Australian politicians